Channel-Port aux Basques is a town at the extreme southwestern tip of Newfoundland fronting on the western end of the Cabot Strait.  A Marine Atlantic ferry terminal is located in the town which is the primary entry point onto the island of Newfoundland and the western terminus of the Newfoundland and Labrador Route 1 (Trans-Canada Highway) in the province.  The town was incorporated in 1945 and its population in the 2021 census was 3,547.

Port aux Basques is the oldest of the collection of villages that make up the present-day town, which consists of Port aux Basques, Channel, Grand Bay and Mouse Island. The town is called "Siinalk" in the Miꞌkmaq language.

History
Channel was settled by fisher-folk from the Channel Islands in the early 1700s. Port aux Basques refers to the harbour that was a favoured sheltering and watering place for Basque whalers who hailed from the Basque region of the Pyrenees of France and Spain during the early 16th century.  After leaving the harbour the whalers either proceeded to the main whaling grounds off southern Labrador, or headed home to the Basque country. They almost certainly took on fresh water from Dead Man's Brook, which flows into Port aux Basques harbour, during their stopovers.

Port aux Basques is first seen on a 1687 Johannes van Keulen map of the area. Permanent settlement came from French fishermen who overwintered on this, the French Shore, using rights given under the 1713 Treaty of Utrecht which saw France cede its claims in Newfoundland to Great Britain in exchange for right of use of coastal lands for the fishery. With the fishery being the economic mainstay for both French and British settlers in the area, Channel-Port aux Basques appeared destined to remain a collection of small fishing villages.

The town of Channel-Port aux Basques was incorporated in 1945. In 1964 the community of Mouse Island was annexed.

Telegraph cable
In 1856, an underwater telegraph cable   was successfully laid between Newfoundland and Cape Breton Island, making landfall nearby. This was the first step in the race to complete a trans-Atlantic telegraph cable. A telegraph station was opened in Port aux Basques in 1857.

Hurricane Fiona
In September 2022, the town was partially evacuated due to Hurricane Fiona. Over 100 homes were reportedly washed away from the wind and storm surge in Newfoundland with a bulk of the homes being from the town. Many locals of the town claimed that it was the worst storm they’ve ever seen, and a community changing event. The town declared a state of emergency on September 24, 2022. On September 26, 2022, RCMP confirmed a 73-year-old Port aux Basques woman was killed after being swept out into the ocean. Newfoundland and Labrador is the only province with a confirmed loss of life directly related to the storm.

Demographics 

Transportation
Both the Trans-Canada Highway and the Trans Canada Trail have their Newfoundland and Labrador start and end points in Port aux Basques.

Railway
In the 1880s, the Government of Canada erected a lighthouse at nearby Cape Ray which, despite being in the then-separate British colony of Newfoundland, was considered a navigation hazard for vessels bound for Canadian ports in the Gulf of Saint Lawrence.

In 1893, it was decided to extend the western terminus of the Newfoundland Railway (then under construction west from the Avalon Peninsula by Robert G. Reid) from St. George's to Port aux Basques harbour.  By 1897 the tracks reached Port aux Basques, although the harbour facilities had not been built at that time to handle the steamer Bruce, which had been built in Scotland and had arrived in Newfoundland several months earlier.  While the required docks were constructed, the Bruce operated between Little Placentia Sound and North Sydney, Nova Scotia from October, 1897 until June, 1898.

Air service
Regular domestic air service to St. John's International Airport and Deer Lake Regional Airport is provided by PAL Airlines year round. Sunwing Airlines provides service to Toronto Pearson International Airport from May to October. Porter Airlines flies to Halifax Stanfield International Airport, Ottawa Macdonald–Cartier International Airport and Billy Bishop Toronto City Airport on a seasonal basis and Air Saint-Pierre offers summer service to Saint-Pierre Airport which serves Saint Pierre and Miquelon the French overseas collective off Newfoundland's south coast.

Ferries
On June 30, 1898, the first passenger train arrived in Port aux Basques, and Bruce departed for North Sydney shortly afterward.  Over the years, the narrow gauge Newfoundland Railway expanded both the number of trains and vessels which called at Port Aux Basques.  In 1925 the steamer SS Caribou began service.  She was attacked and sunk by the German submarine U-69 (1940) on 14 October 1942 with a loss of 137 lives, some from the Port aux Basques area. There were 20 widows from Caribou sinking in the Port aux Basques area.

The Town of Port aux Basques was incorporated in 1945 with Samuel (Sam) Walters as the first mayor.

On March 31, 1949, Newfoundland entered into Confederation and the railway was transferred to Canadian National Railway.  Under Term 32 of the Terms of Union between Canada and Newfoundland (1949), the ferry service between North Sydney, Nova Scotia and Port aux Basques, Newfoundland was guaranteed, first under the British North America Act and after 1982 under the Constitution of Canada.

Upon CNR's assumption of the railway and ferry service, the 1950s saw extensive construction at Port aux Basques with expansion of new dock facilities and the arrival of newer and larger ships such as the MV William Carson. Extensive blasting of rock created space for large rail yards with extensive dual gauge trackage. The excess rock was then used as fill to create the required docks. By the mid-1960s, new railcar-capable ferries such as the MV Frederick Carter permitted the exchange of standard gauge railcars, requiring further expansion at the Port aux Basques terminal facilities.

The mid-1960s also saw the completion of the Trans-Canada Highway across Newfoundland, an event which eventually led to the closure of the railway by 1988, but which made Port aux Basques into an even more important gateway to the island of Newfoundland, given the increased number of tourists visiting the province, and the rising amount of truck traffic.  New Ro-Pax-capable vessels were commissioned and/or chartered during the 1960s-1980s to meet the growing demand, such as Marine Nautica, Marine Atlantica, Marine Evangeline, Ambrose Shea, and John Hamilton Gray.

With the abandonment of the railway, extensive rebuilding of Port aux Basques terminal resulted in expansive marshaling areas for waiting motor vehicle traffic. A plant disease inspection station operated by the Canadian Food Inspection Agency is located on site, as well as a modern rebuilt railway station now used as a passenger terminal for the ferry service operated by Marine Atlantic, which was renamed from CN Marine in 1986.

With a larger carrying capacity and an equivalent ice class to the MV Caribou, the MV Atlantic Vision was introduced as the new flagship for Marine Atlantic. Following the retirement of the MV Caribou and the MV Joseph and Clara Smallwood, two more new ships were acquired on a 5-year charter from Stena Line. Marine Atlantic announced in May 2015 that it would be purchasing both ships for C$100 Million each.

College of the North Atlantic
The Port aux Basques campus of the College of the North Atlantic first opened as the District Vocational School in September 1963. The school was constructed by MR Chappell of Nova Scotia because Lundrigans Ltd of Corner Brook who was constructing the other District Vocational Schools in Newfoundland couldn't move their equipment and supplies over the uncompleted road from Corner Brook to Port aux Basques. The Trans-Canada Highway from Corner Brook to Port aux Basques was completed in 1965.

Climate
Channel-Port aux Basques experiences a maritime-influenced subarctic climate that has the Köppen climate classification code of (Dfc). The location has strong seasonal lag as well as being cold for the latitude. This is since it is being influenced by the Icelandic Low and the Labrador Current, which renders a rare combination of cold and snowy winters along a seacoast at 47°N. In summer the warmup is strongly delayed by the cold waters and westerly winds from the interior of Canada are very cold in winter, further delaying the warming of the water. As a result, August is clearly warmer than July, and even September is more than  warmer than June is.

Sports
Port aux Basques placed second in the top five communities for Kraft Hockeyville 2008, and won $20,000 for its local arena. Its sports arena, Bruce I, burned down in 1995, just prior to the hockey season. It was located on top of Army Hill on a road named Stadium Road down in Channel.  The new arena, Bruce II Sports Centre, was opened on November 23, 1996.

See also
List of lighthouses in Canada
 List of municipalities in Newfoundland and Labrador
 Isle aux Morts

References

External links 

 Channel - Port aux Basques
 U-69 submarine
 Song - Dear Old Port aux Basques by native son David Blackmore
Channel - Port aux Basques - Encyclopedia of Newfoundland and Labrador, vol. 1, p. 400-404. 
 Aids to Navigation Canadian Coast Guard

Populated coastal places in Canada
Towns in Newfoundland and Labrador
Lighthouses in Newfoundland and Labrador